Chah Galleh (also Romanized as Chāh Galleh) is a village in Sharifabad Rural District, in the Central District of Sirjan County, Kerman Province, Iran. At the 2006 census, its population was 92, in 24 families.

References 

Populated places in Sirjan County